Colonial Lake is a tidal pond in Charleston, South Carolina with wide walkways around it. The area is used as a park. For many years the lake was known as the Rutledge Street Pond; some residents still call it "The Pond." It acquired the name Colonial Lake in 1881, in honor of the "Colonial Commons" established in 1768.

History

The lake and its park were part of the Commons established by an Act of the Commons House of Assembly in 1768, setting aside the area forever for public use. The actual lake was created in 1869 when Lynch St. (now Ashley Ave.) was extended south to Broad St., enclosing the area now occupied by the lake. The tradition that the lake was developed as a small boat harbor for planters apparently has no foundation in fact. Most likely, it served as mill pond for a succession of sawmills which operated in the vicinity. 

As seen in the 1872 Bird's Eye View of Charleston, the northwest corner of Colonial Lake originally was land that was possible to develop with a few houses. In 1874, the houses were removed so that improvements to Colonial Lake could continue.

In 1875, a local mill owner, Patrick P. Toale, received a lease for some of the land surrounding the lake. When he tried to purchase the property, local citizens strongly opposed the request and filed a lawsuit to prevent the deal. Judge J.B. Kershaw sided with the opponents, ordering that all remaining property held by the city be retained for the benefit of all Charlestonians and that a commission be created to oversee the property.

The park around the lake was developed in the 1880s. The current configuration of a lake within concrete embankments with a wide promenade on all four sides was largely completed by 1885.

"Gala Week" used to be held in the fall of the year, with a fireworks display on the west side of the Pond, which was then an undeveloped area. Spectators filled to park and crowded onto boats in the lake. Boats were a popular feature of Colonial Lake, and the city even began requiring licenses for them to maintain order on the pond in 1910. Starting that same year, a series of boat and "tub" races were staged in the lake for local boys with money awarded to the winners. For a time, the lake was closed off from the Ashley River with a wire screen and stocked with fish for recreational fishing.

Improvements to the park have been consistent. In 1902, the promenade was improved with a stone pavement. Other improvements were considered, but the lack of security at the site caused officials to question the idea. A dedicated police officer was assigned in 1904. In 1910, palmetto trees were planted along Ashley Ave. and more extensive landscaping was carried out, but officials again noted that vandalism by children playing in the area was causing problems. In 1911, the commissioners who oversaw Colonial Lake announced that new benches would be installed and forty water oaks would be planted. In 1938, the leader of a local club proposed installing a man-made island in the center of the lake, stocking the lake with salt water fish, and promoting it as a destination for visitors; the plan was opposed by residents and did not take place. In 1972, fountains were installed to aerate the lake, but neighbors complained about saltwater overspray, and the fountains often idled due to low water and rusted parts; in 1977, they were removed.

A private group known as the Parks Conservancy announced plans to improve Colonial Lake in 2008. Its plans would have narrowed adjacent Rutledge Ave. by nine feet (to the same width as nearby streets) and installed a more formal landscape around the lake. Plans were completed with some modifications, and an expected January 2015 start date for the four million dollar project was set. Work is expected to be completed in early 2016.

Notes

Parks in Charleston, South Carolina